Thomas Armitage (20 September 1846 – 1923) was a New Zealand cricketer. He played in eight first-class matches for Wellington from 1874 to 1882.

See also
 List of Wellington representative cricketers

References

External links
 

1846 births
1923 deaths
New Zealand cricketers
Wellington cricketers
Cricketers from Sydney